John Edmonds (died 1606), of Cambridge, was an English politician.

Family
Edmonds was the son of John Edmonds, who died in 1544. He married Katherine Walsh, daughter of Roger Walsh of Thaxted, Essex. Together they had five sons and two daughters.

Career
Edmonds was Mayor of Cambridge from 1586 until 1587, and again from 1605 until his death the following year.

He was a Member (MP) of the Parliament of England for Cambridge in 1586.

References

16th-century births
1606 deaths
English MPs 1586–1587
Mayors of Cambridge

Year of birth unknown